Rhizocalyx is a genus of fungi in the family Helotiaceae. This is a monotypic genus, containing the single species Rhizocalyx abietis.

References

Helotiaceae
Monotypic Ascomycota genera